A Time for Drunken Horses (Zamani barayé masti-e asbha) is a 2000 Kurdish language film directed by Bahman Ghobadi and produced in Iran. It was a co-winner of the Caméra d'Or award at the Cannes Film Festival in 2000. Leonard Maltin notes that the film was "written by the director and shot in his native village, with a cast of extraordinary non-professionals."

Plot 
A Kurdish family is trying to survive after the death of its parents. Ayoub, the eldest boy in the family, becomes the head of the household and must do whatever work available to survive. Madi, Ayoub's handicapped brother, is in need of a medical operation. Ayoub goes to great lengths to collect money for the operation by smuggling truck tires with a group of Kurdish villagers near the Iran-Iraq border. Ayoub ultimately falls short of his intended goal and his uncle decides to marry off his sister in return for the groom's family financing Madi's operation on the Iraqi side of the border. When they arrive the mother of the groom refuses to accept Madi and agrees to give Ayoub and his uncle a mule as compensation. Ayoub decides to take the mule to Iraq where it is worth more, and sell it to pay for his brother's surgery. Some smugglers let him come along with him. They use mules to carry goods and feed them whisky allowing them to better survive the harsh mountain winter. But they are ambushed while heading to the border, and the horses are too drunk to carry on. Ayoub narrowly manages to escape, and the last shot is of him and his brother crossing the border.

Cast 
Ayoub Ahmadi
Rojin Younessi
Amaneh Ekhtiar-dini
Madi Ekhtiar-dini
Kolsolum Ekhtiar-dini
Karim Ekhtiar-dini
Rahman Salehi
Osman Karimi
Nezhad Ekhtiar-dini

Reception 

Review aggregator website Rotten Tomatoes has an 85% "fresh" score based on 35 reviews. Leonard Maltin gave the film 3½ (out of 4) stars, stating the following: "The everyday struggle that these children go through just to survive is starkly, movingly conveyed."

Awards 
Best Film Award, Golden Camera (Caméra d'Or), Cannes Film Festival, France, 2000.
Special Jury Award, Silver Hugo, Chicago International Film Festival, USA, 2000.
Best Feature Award, Edinburgh Film Festival, Scotland, UK, 2000.
Best Feature Award, Santa Fe Film Festival, Fort Lauderdale, USA, 2000.
Grand Jury Award, São Paulo International Film Festival, Brazil, 2000.
Best Feature, Banff International Film Festival, Canada, 2000.
Special Jury Award, Gijón International Film Festival, Spain, 2000.
Best feature Award, Children Film Festival, Isfahan, Iran, 2000.

Home media 

The film was released on VHS in letterbox format on 29 July 2003. Lorber Films (Kino) released it on DVD in Region 1 on 15 February 2011, with English subtitles.

See also 
 Kurdish Cinema

References

External links 
 

2000 films
Iranian war drama films
Kurdish films
Kurdish-language films
Persian-language films
Films directed by Bahman Ghobadi
Caméra d'Or winners
Films about children